Hartfield-Zodys was an American retail corporation begun in 1960. It operated the Hartfield chain of women's ready-to-wear apparel in the Los Angeles area, and starting in 1960, the Zodys chain of discount retail stores (1960–1986), which operated locations in California, Arizona, Nevada, New Mexico, and Michigan.

Hartfield's

Hartfield was present on Broadway (Los Angeles), the main shopping district in the Los Angeles area, in the 1940s, at 545 Broadway, and a 1943 advertisement showed branches at 253 S. Market St. in Inglewood, 650 Pacific Boulevard in Huntington Park, and 705 S. Pacific in San Pedro (the latter opened 1941); busy downtown shopping districts of what were once separate towns that had become working and middle class suburbs of Los Angeles. Branches opened across Greater Los Angeles over the following decades.

Zodys
Hartfield’s decided to enter the discount department store business with a new chain to be called Zodys, and opened its first one on June 13, 1960, in Garden Grove, in Central Orange County, California. From 1962 the parent company changed its name to Hartfield-Zodys. By 1969 there were 19 stores. In 1972, Hartfield-Zodys acquired the Yankee Stores chain of Flint, Michigan, briefly re-branding the stores as Yankee-Zodys, and later as Zodys. In 1969 Zodys opened a 6.5-acre distribution center employing 300. The Michigan stores were unprofitable, and were sold in 1974 when Hartfield-Zodys filed for Chapter 11 bankruptcy protection. A brief period of prosperity brought expansions into Arizona, Nevada and New Mexico. In 1979 there were 37 stores.

Locations included:

Garden Grove, 9852 Chapman Ave. Opened 6/15/1960
Redondo Beach, 1413 Hawthorne Blvd. Opened 11/3/1960
Long Beach, 5933 Spring Street. Opened 8/13/1961
Northridge, 10201 Reseda Blvd. Opened 10/27/1961
Canoga Park, 8201 Topanga Canyon Road. Opened 9/27/1962
West Covina, 615 N. Azusa Road. Opened 9/27/1962
Burbank, 1000 N. San Fernando Road. Opened 12/6/1962
Anaheim, 120 W.Orangethorpe, Opened 7/19/1967
Huntington Beach, 6912 Edinger Ave. Opened 8/10/1967
Buena Park, 121 N. Beach Blvd. Opened 11/19/1967
Santa Ana, 1900 N.Grand Ave. Opened 10/20/1968
Norwalk, 10901 E. Imperial Hwy. Opened 10/27/1968
Fountain Valley, 16111 Harbor Blvd. Opened 11/13/1968
Long Beach, 2185 South Street. Opened 9/29/1968
Pomona, 1444 E. Holt Drive. Opened 6/8/1969
Inglewood, 3200 W. Century Blvd. Opened 8/17/1969
North Hollywood, 12727 Sherman Way. Opened 10/19/1969
Lynwood, 4050 Imperial Hwy. Opened October 1969
Fullerton, 120 E. Imperial Hwy. Opened 11/30/1969
El Monte, 4901 Santa Anita Drive. Opened 5/10/1970
Torrance, 851 W. Sepulveda. Opened 6/21/1970
Ladera Heights, 4925 W. Slauson. Opened 8/ /1970
Bakersfield, 4001 Ming Street. Opened 9/9/1970
Riverside, 3700 N. Tyler Street. Opened 10/ /1970
Downtown Los Angeles, 437 S. Broadway. Opened 3/21/1971
Hollywood, 5420 W. Sunset Blvd. Opened 10/20/1971
San Bernardino, 555 W. 2nd Street. Opened / /1972
Alhambra, 600 E. Valley Blvd. Opened 9/9/1973
Montebello, 2441 Via Campo. Opened 1974
Fresno, 5422 Blackstone Opened 1974
City Of Industry, 151 S. Hacienda Blvd. Opened 8/15/1977
Pasadena, 900 North Lake. Opened 5/2/1978
Indio, 82266 Hwy 111. Opened 9/30/1979
Midtown, 4801 Venice Blvd. Opened 10/15/1980
Boyle Heights, 2800 E. 1st Street. Opened 10/22/1980
Vermont/Slauson, 5850 South Vermont, Los Angeles.Opened 11/20/81
Oxnard, 830 Wagon Wheel Road
Oceanside, 2505 Vista Way
San Jose, 920 Blossom Hill
Sunnyvale, 121 El Camino Real
San Jose, 375 North Capital Avenue
Las Vegas, 2120 South Decatur Blvd
Upland, 1445 East Foothill Blvd, Opened 1982
East Riverside, 3900 Chicago Ave. Opened 1982

Epilogue
Bankrupt again by the early 1980s, the parent company, now known as HRT Industries, began closing stores in 1984. The remaining Zodys stores in California were shuttered in March 1986, with many locations being sold to Federated Stores, the parent company of Ralphs supermarket chain, while other locations were purchased by HomeClub, a home improvement store chain.

References

Companies based in Los Angeles
Retail companies disestablished in 1986
Defunct companies based in California
Defunct discount stores of the United States
Retail companies established in 1960
1960 establishments in California
Defunct department stores based in Greater Los Angeles
1986 disestablishments in California